Connor Austin Lammert (born August 31, 1994) is an American former professional basketball player for Cyberdyne Ibaraki Robots in Japan.

References

External links
Texas Longhorns bio

1994 births
Living people
American expatriate basketball people in Japan
American men's basketball players
Basketball players from Tampa, Florida
Basketball players from San Antonio
Cyberdyne Ibaraki Robots players
Hiroshima Dragonflies players
Nishinomiya Storks players
Power forwards (basketball)
Texas Longhorns men's basketball players